Paul Byers Trevithick (born 1959) is currently a client partner and senior director at EPAM, advisor to early-stage startups, technologist, privacy advocate, and entrepreneur.

Education
He grew up in Ottawa, Canada, attended MIT, and received a Bachelor of Science in electrical engineering and computer science in 1981 and was a research assistant at the MIT Media Lab in 1981 and 1982.

Career
In 1981, he co-founded Lightspeed Computers which was ultimately acquired by DuPont. He was CEO and co-founder in 1985 of Archetype, Inc. which became the Pageflex division of Bitstream Inc. in April 1997. Trevithick then served as Bitstream's vice president of marketing, and starting in August 1998 its president.

Trevithick has contributed to World Wide Web Consortium, PODI, Organization for the Advancement of Structured Information Standards (OASIS), and ITU-T standards efforts. He was granted the Seybold Industry Vision award in 1999.

Trevithick led the development of the Experimental Laboratory for Investigating Collaboration, Information-sharing, and Trust (ELICIT)  web-based platform under contract to the United States Department of Defense (OASD/NII) Command and Control Research Program (CCRP). ELICIT is a tool used in social science research.

He joined EPAM in Dec 2013 and is currently a client partner and senior director.

Work on information privacy and personal data
From 2003 to 2009, Trevithick worked on open source identity software for Internet security, and privacy for digital identities and social networks on the Internet. He co-authored a paper on "Identity and Resilience" that was one of the 100 papers cited as informing the 2009 US White House CyberPolicy Review.

He initiated and co-led what became the Eclipse Foundation's Higgins project. Supporting this effort, he co-founded the SocialPhysics project in collaboration with the Berkman Klein Center for Internet & Society and co-founded the IdentityGang, now a part of Identity Commons. In 2008 Trevithick founded the Information Card Foundation and served as its chair. In 2009 he co-founded and was a co-chair of the Kantara Initiative Universal Login User Experience Working Group. Trevithick is a past member of the Kantara Leadership Council and a steward of Identity Commons.

In 2009, Trevithick founded Azigo and was until 2020 its chairman. 

His most recent article on personal data is User-exclusive Data. 

In 2021 he founded The Mee Foundation, a nonprofit dedicated to giving internet users more control over their personal data and thereby increased privacy, convenience, and autonomy.

Footnotes

1959 births
Living people
People from Winston-Salem, North Carolina
21st-century American engineers
American chief executives
American chief technology officers
American chief operating officers
MIT School of Engineering alumni